The Taipei Botanical Garden is located in the Nanhai Academy on Nanhai Road in Zhongzheng District, Taipei, Taiwan.  The Botanical Garden covers an area of about 15 hectares and includes over 1,500 plant species.

History
The Taipei Botanical Garden was originally established during Japanese rule in 1921, although the garden itself has been in existence since 1896. It is maintained by the Taiwan Forestry Research Institute. In 1930, there were 1,129 species in the garden, serving largely academic research and natural sciences. However, the garden was deserted during World War II. After the war, the garden was rearranged and new plants were introduced.

Overview
Currently, the garden is maintained and has over 1,500 species of plants. There are 17 districts in the garden, exhibiting various plants. The 9 ponds are also designed to grow different plants. There are two buildings in the botanical garden currently listed as historical structures. One is a Qing Dynasty era Taiwan administration building build in 1888 and relocated to the garden in modern times. The other is a herbarium.

Transportation
The garden is accessible within walking distance West from Chiang Kai-shek Memorial Hall Station of the Taipei Metro.

See also
 List of parks in Taiwan
 List of tourist attractions in Taiwan

References

External links

 

Tourist attractions in Taipei
Botanical gardens in Taiwan